This is the full medal table of the 1956 Winter Olympics, which were held in Cortina d'Ampezzo, Italy. These rankings sort by the number of gold medals earned by a country. The number of silvers is taken into consideration next and then the number of bronze. If, after the above, countries are still tied, equal ranking is given and they are listed alphabetically. This follows the system used by the IOC, IAAF and BBC. Poland, and Japan won their first Winter Olympic Medal at these games. Japan's medal was also the first Winter Olympics Medal for an Asian nation.

The Soviet Union, in their first Winter Olympics, won more gold and total medals than any other nation. USSR's investment in elite sports would lead to their domination of the Olympics for the next three decades, as the Soviets would top the Winter Games from 1956 to 1988 with the exception of 1968 and 1984.

  Two gold medals were awarded when Soviet skaters tied for first in the  speed skating competition.

References

External links
 
 
 
 

Medal table
1956